FLAVORx is a private company based in Columbia, Maryland, United States that supplies sugar-free, non allergenic, and inert medicine flavorings and flavoring systems to pharmacies. The company was established in 1995 in Washington, D.C. It offers 18 pediatric flavors and 17 veterinary flavors which can be added to prescription and over-the-counter liquid medications. 

Flavorx can be found in 46,000+ pharmacies and has flavored over 100 million prescriptions. Flavorx uses Fillmaster RO and 6 stage water filtration system along with annual FillPure visits to ensure USP compliance in chain and independent pharmacies. Flavorx has several flavoring machines. The PRO displays the formulary but requires manual measurement of flavor. They also have  AUTO, which reconstitutes and flavors automatically. Flavorx can be found in most major chains and independent pharmacies.

The flavorings are intended to improve the palatability of their host medications by suppressing bitterness, adding sweetness, and/or enhancing the flavor profile. The flavoring of liquid medicines using these products has been shown to improve pediatric drug compliance. The firm also sells Pill Glide, a flavored spray designed to lubricate the mouth and throat, making pills easier to swallow.

References

Further reading

External links 

Privately held companies based in Maryland
Flavor companies
Pharmaceutical companies of the United States